Jānis Timma (born 2 July 1992) is a Latvian professional basketball player for Grises de Humacao of the Puerto Rican Baloncesto Superior Nacional (BSN). He also represents the senior Latvian national team.

Professional career

Timma grew up playing basketball in his hometown of Krāslava, but he later moved to Rīga at age 15. At first he joined ASK Rīga's youth system, and made a few appearances for its senior team, during the end of the 2008–09 season. The following year, ASK Riga was dissolved and he played with DSN Rīga, a team that consisted of young Latvian talents. Timma helped DSN Rīga to win the Latvian 2nd division in the 2009–10 season. He also spent the majority of the next season playing with DSN Rīga.

Timma joined Liepājas Lauvas for the 2011–12 season. That can be considered his first real season at the pro level. After a decent season in Liepāja, Timma made the next step in his career. On 1 August 2012, he signed a multi-year contract with Ventspils.

In April 2013, he led Ventspils to the Baltic Basketball League championship, and he won the Finals MVP award.

In his second season with Ventspils, Timma won his first Latvian League championship, and he was named the MVP of the playoffs.

On 28 July 2014, he signed with the Latvian club VEF Rīga, where he played for the first time in such quality competition as the European-wide secondary league, the EuroCup, and the VTB United League.

Timma was named the MVP of the 2015 Latvian Basketball League All-Star Game, after he scored 41 points, and set a new scoring record. On 5 May 2015, he was named the VTB United League Young Player of the Year. He finished the season with VEF Rīga, by winning the Latvian League (LBL) championship. In total, he played in 58 games with VEF Riga, averaging 12.6 points per game, in all the competitions that his team participated in.

On 30 June 2015, he signed a two-year contract with the Russian team Zenit St. Petersburg.

On 8 June 2017, Timma signed a three-year deal with the Spanish club Baskonia.

On 18 July 2018, Timma parted ways with Baskonia and signed a two-year deal with the Greek club Olympiacos of the EuroLeague.

His stint in Greece proved unsuccessful and he was loaned to fellow EuroLeague club Khimki Moscow on 12 March 2019 for the remainder of the 2018–19 season. On 27 June 2019 Timma signed on to continue playing for the Russian team with a two-year contract.

On 15 November 2021 Timma signed a temporary deal with UNICS Kazan of the VTB United League. On December 6, he was waived by the Russian club.

On 31 January 2022 Timma signed with the Lakeland Magic, as they held his draft rights.

On 23 December 2022 Timma signed with Grises de Humacao of the Puerto Rican Baloncesto Superior Nacional (BSN) until the end of the season.

NBA draft rights
In 2013, Timma declared for the 2013 NBA draft. He was selected with the last pick (60th overall) by the Memphis Grizzlies.

On 24 June 2015, the Memphis Grizzlies traded Timma's draft rights to the Orlando Magic in exchange for Luke Ridnour.

National team career
With Latvia's junior national team, Timma won a bronze medal at the 2010 FIBA Europe Under-18 Championship. In 2013, he made his first appearance with the senior Latvian national team. With Latvia's senior team, he has played at the 2015 EuroBasket, the 2016 Belgrade FIBA Olympic Qualifying Tournament, and the 2017 EuroBasket.

Career statistics

EuroLeague

|-
| style="text-align:left;"| 2017–18
| style="text-align:left;"| Baskonia
| 33 || 27 || 22.8 || .483 || .412 || .767 || 2.3 || 1.2 || .9 || .1 || 7.6 || 7.1
|-
| style="text-align:left;"| 2018–19
| style="text-align:left;"| Olympiacos
| 23 || 9 || 11.3 || .474 || .404 || .500 || .9 || .7 || .3 || .1 || 3.4 || 2.1
|-
| style="text-align:left;"| 2019–20
| style="text-align:left;" rowspan=2| Khimki
| 21 || 20 || 29.5 || .540 || .375 || .682 || 3.1 || 2.0 || 1.2 || .3 || 15.5 || 11.2
|-
| style="text-align:left;"| 2020–21
| 16 || 10 || 24.8 || .364 || .350 || .727 || 2.8 || .9 || 1.0 || .2 || 7.1 || 5.6
|-
|- class="sortbottom"
| style="text-align:center;" colspan=2| Career
| 96 || 68 || 21.5 || .428 || .382 || .704 || 2.2 || 1.2 || .8 || .1 || 7.4 || 5.9

References

External links
 Janis Timma at acb.com 
 Janis Timma at archive.fiba.com
 Jānis Timma at draftexpress.com
 Janis Timma at esake.gr 
 Jānis Timma at eurobasket.com
 Jānis Timma at euroleague.net

1992 births
Living people
ASK Riga players
BC Khimki players
BC UNICS players
BC Zenit Saint Petersburg players
BK Liepājas Lauvas players
BK VEF Rīga players
BK Ventspils players
Lakeland Magic players
Latvian expatriate basketball people in Greece
Latvian expatriate basketball people in Russia
Latvian expatriate basketball people in Spain
Latvian expatriate basketball people in the United States
Latvian men's basketball players
Liga ACB players
Memphis Grizzlies draft picks
Olympiacos B.C. players
People from Krāslava
Saski Baskonia players
Shooting guards
Small forwards